A total solar eclipse occurred on January 22, 1898. A solar eclipse occurs when the Moon passes between Earth and the Sun, thereby totally or partly obscuring the image of the Sun for a viewer on Earth. A total solar eclipse occurs when the Moon's apparent diameter is larger than the Sun's, blocking all direct sunlight, turning day into darkness. Totality occurs in a narrow path across Earth's surface, with the partial solar eclipse visible over a surrounding region thousands of kilometres wide.
It was visible across central Africa, and into India and Asia.

Observations

There were two organised expeditions to India to observe this eclipse. One was from the British Astronomical Association and the other was led by K D Naegamvala of the Maharaja Taihtasingji Observatory.

Related eclipses
It is part of solar Saros 139.

References

 NASA graphic
 Googlemap
 NASA Besselian elements
 
 The Indian eclipse, 1898 : report of the expeditions organized by the British Astronomical Association to observe the total solar eclipse of 1898 January 22 / edited by E. Walter Maunder.
 
 Photo of Solar Corona January 22, 1898

1898 01 22
1898 in science
1898 01 22
January 1898 events